Every Girl's Dream is a 1917 American silent drama film directed by Harry F. Millarde and starring June Caprice, Kittens Reichert, and Harry Hilliard.

Cast
 June Caprice as Gretchen 
 Kittens Reichert as Jane Cummings 
 Harry Hilliard as Carl 
 Margaret Fielding as Hulda 
 Marcia Harris as Frau Van Lorn 
 Dan Mason as Mynheer De Haas

Preservation
With no prints of Every Girl's Dream located in any film archives, it is a lost film.

References

Bibliography
 Solomon, Aubrey. The Fox Film Corporation, 1915-1935: A History and Filmography. McFarland, 2011.

External links
 

1917 films
1917 drama films
1910s English-language films
American silent feature films
Silent American drama films
American black-and-white films
Films directed by Harry F. Millarde
Fox Film films
1910s American films